Association Sportive du Port, more commonly known as AS Port or simply Port, is a Djiboutian football club located in Djibouti City, Djibouti. It currently plays in Djibouti Premier League.

Titles
Djibouti Premier League: 4
2010, 2011, 2012, 2019.

Djibouti Cup: 5
1988, 1989, 2010, 2011, 2013.

Djibouti Super Cup: 1
2013.

Football clubs in Djibouti